António Pestana Garcia Pereira is a Portuguese lawyer and politician, former leader of the Maoist PCTP/MRPP. He was a candidate in the 2006 presidential election, where he placed sixth (and last) with 0.44 per cent of the vote. He had already run in the 2001 presidential election, getting 1.69 per cent of the vote.

Election results

2001 Portuguese presidential election

António Garcia Pereira finished fifth with 68,900 votes (1.59%).

2006 Portuguese presidential election

António Garcia Pereira finished sixth with 23,983 votes (0.44%).

References

Garcia Pereira, Antonio
Garcia Pereira, Antonio
Living people
Garcia Pereira, Antonio
21st-century Portuguese lawyers
Year of birth missing (living people)